Okulovsky is a rural locality (a settlement) in Kamenskoye Urban Rural Settlement of Mezensky District, Arkhangelsk Oblast, Russia. The population was 2 as of 2010.

Geography 
Okulovsky is located on the Mezen River, 19 km north of Mezen (the district's administrative centre) by road. Chetsa is the nearest rural locality.

References 

Rural localities in Mezensky District